Gary Bertram Troup  (born 3 October 1952) is a New Zealand former cricketer and local politician who played 15 Tests and 22 One Day Internationals for New Zealand.

International career
Troup made his Test debut for the New Zealand on 18 November 1976 against India. He was born in Taumarunui.

In 1979/80, at the dramatic conclusion to the First Test against Clive Lloyd's West Indians at Carisbrook, Dunedin, Troup was joined at the crease by Stephen Boock with New Zealand 9/100 and needing four more runs to win this historic match.

The two tailenders took the Black Caps to their first test win over the West Indies, and what would ultimately become their first series win over the Caribbean giants, when they scrambled through for a leg bye as scores were level. In a controversial tour, marred by umpiring disputes and some ugly onfield behaviour by the tourists, New Zealand won the series 1–0 after drawing the next two tests in Christchurch and Auckland.

In what was Troup's best test series he finished with 18 wickets for 371 runs (av. 20.61) including a ten wicket haul in the Third Test at Eden Park (4–71 and 6–95).

He played his final test for New Zealand in 1986.

Political career
Troup served twelve years on the Papatoetoe Community Board; six of those years as chairman. He was then elected as a councillor for the Papatoetoe ward on the Manukau City Council in 2007. In April 2008 he was made the Deputy Mayor, replacing Su’a William Sio.

In the 2010 Auckland Council elections Troup ran in the Manukau Ward, placing fifth with 9,136 votes.

Honours
In the 2016 Queen's Birthday Honours, Troup was appointed an Officer of the New Zealand Order of Merit for services to sport and the community.

References

External links

1952 births
Living people
Auckland cricketers
Cricketers at the 1979 Cricket World Cup
New Zealand One Day International cricketers
New Zealand Test cricketers
New Zealand cricketers
New Zealand sportsperson-politicians
Deputy mayors of places in New Zealand
Manukau City Councillors
Officers of the New Zealand Order of Merit
D. H. Robins' XI cricketers
North Island cricketers